Hyadina albovenosa is a species of shore flies in the family Ephydridae.

Distribution
Canada, United States, Mexico, El Salvador.

References

Ephydridae
Insects described in 1900
Diptera of North America
Taxa named by Daniel William Coquillett